Korea was ruled as a part of the Empire of Japan from 1910 to 1945. Joseon had come into the Japanese sphere of influence with the Japan–Korea Treaty of 1876; a complex coalition of the Meiji government, military, and business officials began a process of integrating Korea's politics and economy with Japan. The Korean Empire, proclaimed in 1897, became a protectorate of Japan with the Japan–Korea Treaty of 1905; thereafter Japan ruled the country indirectly through the Japanese Resident-General of Korea. Japan formally annexed the Korean Empire with the Japan–Korea Treaty of 1910, without the consent of the former Korean Emperor Gojong, the regent of the Emperor Sunjong. Upon its annexation, Japan declared that Korea would henceforth be officially named Chōsen. This name was recognized internationally until the end of Japanese colonial rule. The territory was administered by the Governor-General of Chōsen based in Keijō (Seoul).

Japanese rule prioritized Korea's Japanization, accelerated the industrialization started during the Gwangmu Reform era of 1897 to 1907, built public works, and suppressed the Korean independence movement. The public works included developing railroads (Gyeongbu Line, Gyeongui Line, Gyeongwon Line, etc.) and improving major roads and ports that supported economic development. Averages for the annual GNP growth-rate of Chōsen were comparable to those in the Japanese naichi, ranging from 2.3% to 4.2% during the 25 years preceding the Second Sino-Japanese War. By the time of the Pacific War, industrial growth and output in Chōsen approached that of the naichi.

Japanese rule over Korea ended on 15 August 1945 with the surrender of Japan in World War II. The armed forces of the United States and the Soviet Union subsequently occupied this region. Their division of Korea separated the Korean Peninsula into two different governments and economic systems: the northern Soviet Civil Administration and the southern United States Army Military Government in Korea. These post-war administrative areas were succeeded respectively by the modern independent states of North Korea and South Korea. Japan officially relinquished the claims of Korea in the signing of Treaty of San Francisco on 28 April 1952.

In 1965, the Treaty on Basic Relations between Japan and South Korea declared that previous unequal treaties between both countries, especially those of 1905 and 1910, were "already null and void" at the time of their promulgation. Interpretations of Japanese rule over Korea remain controversial in Japan and both North and South Korea.

Terminology

In South Korea, the period is usually described as the "Imperial Japanese occupation". Other terms, although often considered obsolete, include "Japanese Imperial Period", "The dark Japanese Imperial Period", and "Wae (Japanese) administration".

In Japan, the term  has been used.

Background

Political turmoil in Korea

Japan–Korea Treaty of 1876

On 27 February 1876, the Japan–Korea Treaty of 1876, also known in Japan as the Japanese–Korea Treaty of Amity (Japanese: ,  meaning Japan-Chosun friendly relations treaty,  meaning Treaty of Ganghwa island) was signed. It was designed to open up Korea to Japanese trade, and the rights granted to Japan under the treaty were similar to those granted Western powers in Japan following the visit of Commodore Perry in 1854. The treaty ended Korea's status as a protectorate of China, forced open three Korean ports to Japanese trade, granted extraterritorial rights to Japanese citizens, and was an unequal treaty signed under duress (gunboat diplomacy) of the Ganghwa Island incident of 1875.

As a result of the treaty, Japanese merchants came to Busan, which became the center for foreign trade and commerce. Japanese officials then published Korea's first newspaper, in 1881. Chinese language articles were aimed at Korea's educated elite, which advocated for constitutional government, freedom of speech, strong rule of law and legal rights, and Korean-led industrialization. Few of these goals came to pass. Japanese language articles focused on news regarding business, specifically "the stagnant Pusan trade" in rice and other farmed goods, which fluctuated wildly due to weather conditions and the whims of the tax-levying elite class. It ceased publication sometime after May 1882.

Imo Incident

The regent Daewongun, who remained opposed to any concessions to Japan or the West, helped organize the Mutiny of 1882, an anti-Japanese outbreak against Queen Min and her allies. Motivated by resentment of the preferential treatment given to newly trained troops, the Daewongun's forces, or "old military", killed a Japanese training cadre, and attacked the Japanese legation. Japanese diplomats, policemen, students, and some Min clan members were also killed during the incident. The Daewongun was briefly restored to power, only to be forcibly taken to China by Chinese troops dispatched to Seoul to prevent further disorder.

In August 1882, the Treaty of Jemulpo (Japan–Korea Treaty of 1882) indemnified the families of the Japanese victims, paid reparations to the Japanese government in the amount of 500,000 yen, and allowed a company of Japanese guards to be stationed at the Japanese legation in Seoul.

Gapsin coup

The struggle between the Heungseon Daewongun's followers and those of Queen Min was further complicated by competition from a Korean independence faction known as the Progressive Party (Gaehwa-dang), as well as the Conservative faction. While the former sought Japan's support, the latter sought China's support. On 4 December 1884, the Progressive Party, assisted by the Japanese, attempted a coup (Gapsin coup) and established a pro-Japanese government under the reigning king, dedicated to the independence of Korea from Chinese suzerainty. However, this proved short-lived, as conservative Korean officials requested the help of Chinese forces stationed in Korea. The coup was put down by Chinese troops, and a Korean mob killed both Japanese officers and Japanese residents in retaliation. Some leaders of the Progressive Party, including Kim Ok-gyun, fled to Japan, while others were executed. For the next 10 years, Japanese expansion into the Korean economy was approximated only by the efforts of czarist Russia.

Donghak Revolution and First Sino-Japanese War

The outbreak of the Donghak peasant revolution in 1894 provided a seminal pretext for direct military intervention by Japan in the affairs of Korea. In April 1894, the Korean government asked for Chinese assistance in ending the Donghak peasant revolt. In response, Japanese leaders, citing a violation of the Convention of Tientsin as a pretext, decided upon military intervention to challenge China. On 3 May 1894, 1,500 Qing forces appeared in Incheon. Japan won the First Sino-Japanese War, and China signed the Treaty of Shimonoseki in 1895. Among its many stipulations, the treaty recognized "the full and complete independence and autonomy of Korea", thus ending Korea's tributary relationship with the Chinese Qing dynasty, leading to the proclamation of full independence of Joseon Korea in 1895. At the same time, Japan suppressed the Donghak revolution with Korean government forces. With the exception of czarist Russia, Japan now held military predominance in Korea.

Assassination of Queen Min

The Japanese minister to Korea, Miura Gorō, orchestrated a plot against 43-year-old Queen Min (later given the title of "Empress Myeongseong"), and on 8 October 1895, she was assassinated by Japanese agents. In 2001, Russian reports on the assassination were found in the archives of the Foreign Ministry of the Russian Federation. The documents included the testimony of King Gojong, several witnesses of the assassination, and Karl Ivanovich Weber's report to Aleksey Lobanov-Rostovsky, the Foreign Minister of Russia, by Park Jonghyo. Weber was the chargé d'affaires at the Russian legation in Seoul at that time. According to a Russian eyewitness, Seredin-Sabatin, an employee of the king, a group of Japanese agents entered Gyeongbokgung, killed Queen Min, and desecrated her body in the north wing of the palace.

When he heard the news, Heungseon Daewongun returned to the royal palace the same day. On 11 February 1896, King Gojong and the crown prince moved from Gyeongbokgung to the Russian legation in Jeong-dong, Seoul, from where they governed for about one year, an event known as the Korea royal refuge at the Russian legation.

Democracy protests and the proclamation of the Korean Empire

After the Royal Refuge, some Korean activists established the Independence Club in 1896. They claimed that Korea should negotiate with Western powers, particularly Russia, to counterbalance the growing influence of Japan. In 1897, this club had destroyed the Yeongeunmun, a special gate, built in 1537, where Chinese envoys had been escorted and received, and contributed to the construction of Independence Gate and they held regular meetings in the Jongno streets, demanding democratic reforms as Korea became a constitutional monarchy, and an end to Japanese and Russian influence in Korean affairs.

In October 1897, Gojong decided to return to his other palace, Deoksugung, and proclaimed the founding of the Korean Empire. During this period, the Korean government conducted a westernization policy. It was not an enduring reform, however, and the Independence Club was dissolved on 25 December 1898 as the new Emperor Gojong officially announced a prohibition on unofficial congresses.

Prelude to annexation

Having established economic and military dominance in Korea in October 1904, Japan reported that it had developed 25 reforms which it intended to introduce into Korea by gradual degrees. Among these was the intended acceptance by the Korean Financial Department of a Japanese Superintendent, the replacement of Korean Foreign Ministers and consuls by Japanese and the "union of military arms" in which the military of Korea would be modeled after the Japanese military. These reforms were forestalled by the prosecution of the Russo-Japanese War from 8 February 1904, to 5 September 1905, which Japan won, thus eliminating Japan's last rival to influence in Korea. Under the Treaty of Portsmouth, signed in September 1905, Russia acknowledged Japan's "paramount political, military, and economic interest" in Korea.

Two months later, Korea was obliged to become a Japanese protectorate by the Japan–Korea Treaty of 1905 and the "reforms" were enacted, including the reduction of the Korean Army from 20,000 to 1,000 men by disbanding all garrisons in the provinces, retaining only a single garrison in the precincts of Seoul. On 6 January 1905, Horace Allen, head of the American Legation in Seoul reported to his Secretary of State, John Hay, that the Korean government had been advised by the Japanese government "that hereafter the police matters of Seoul will be controlled by the Japanese gendarmerie" and "that a Japanese police inspector will be placed in each prefecture". A large number of Koreans organized themselves in education and reform movements, but Japanese dominance in Korea had become a reality.

In June 1907, the Second Peace Conference was held in The Hague. Emperor Gojong secretly sent three representatives to bring the problems of Korea to the world's attention. The three envoys were refused access to the public debates by the international delegates who questioned the legality of the protectorate convention. Out of despair, one of the Korean representatives, Yi Tjoune, committed suicide at The Hague. In response, the Japanese government took stronger measures. On 19 July 1907, Emperor Gojong was forced to relinquish his imperial authority and appoint the Crown Prince as regent. Japanese officials used this concession to force the accession of the new Emperor Sunjong following abdication, which was never agreed to by Gojong. Neither Gojong nor Sunjong was present at the 'accession' ceremony. Sunjong was to be the last ruler of the Joseon dynasty, founded in 1392.

Japan–Korea annexation treaty (1910)

In May 1910, the Minister of War of Japan, Terauchi Masatake, was given a mission to finalize Japanese control over Korea after the previous treaties (the Japan–Korea Treaty of 1904 and the Japan–Korea Treaty of 1907) had made Korea a protectorate of Japan and had established Japanese hegemony over Korean domestic politics. On 22 August 1910, Japan effectively annexed Korea with the Japan–Korea Treaty of 1910 signed by Ye Wanyong, Prime Minister of Korea, and Terauchi Masatake, who became the first Japanese Governor-General of Korea.

The treaty became effective the same day and was published one week later. The treaty stipulated:
 Article 1: His Majesty the Emperor of Korea concedes completely and definitely his entire sovereignty over the whole Korean territory to His Majesty the Emperor of Japan.
 Article 2: His Majesty the Emperor of Japan accepts the concession stated in the previous article and consents to the annexation of Korea to the Empire of Japan.

Both the protectorate and the annexation treaties were declared already void in the 1965 Treaty on Basic Relations between Japan and the Republic of Korea .

This period is also known as Military Police Reign Era (1910–19) in which Police had the authority to rule the entire country. Japan was in control of the media, law as well as government by physical power and regulations.

In March 2010, 109 Korean intellectuals and 105 Japanese intellectuals met in the 100th anniversary of Japan–Korea Treaty of 1910 and they declared this annexation treaty null and void. They declared these statements in each of their capital cities (Seoul and Tōkyō) with a simultaneous press conference. They announced the "Japanese empire pressured the outcry of the Korean Empire and people and forced by Japan–Korea Treaty of 1910 and full text of a treaty was false and text of the agreement was also false". They also declared the "Process and formality of "Japan–Korea Treaty of 1910" had huge deficiencies and therefore the treaty was null and void. This meant the March 1st Movement was not an illegal movement.

Righteous army

One of the Korean righteous armies of rebels was formed in the earlier 1900s after the Japanese occupation. The Righteous Army was formed by Yu In-seok and other Confucian scholars during the Peasant Wars. Its ranks swelled after the Queen's murder by the Japanese troops and Koreans. Under the leadership of Min Jeong-sik, Choe Ik-hyeon, and Shin Dol-seok, the Righteous Army attacked the Japanese army, Japanese merchants and pro-Japanese bureaucrats in the provinces of Gangwon, Chungcheong, Jeolla, and Gyeongsang.

Shin Dol-seok, an uneducated peasant commanded over 3,000 troops. Among the troops were former government soldiers, poor peasants, fishermen, tiger hunters, miners, merchants, and laborers. During the Japan-Korea Treaty of 1907, the Korean army was disbanded on August 1, 1907. The Army was led by 1st Battalion Commander Major Park Seung-hwan, who later committed suicide after it was disbanded. Former soldiers of Korea started a revolt against the Japanese army at the Namdaemun Gate. The disbanded army joined the Righteous Armies and together they solidified a foundation for the Righteous Armies battle.

In 1907, the Righteous Army under the command of Yi In-yeong massed 10,000 troops to liberate Seoul and defeat the Japanese. The Army came within 12 km of Seoul but could not withstand the Japanese counter-offensive. The Righteous Army was no match for two infantry divisions of 20,000 Japanese soldiers backed by warships moored near Incheon.

The Righteous Army retreated from Seoul and the war went on for two more years. Over 17,000 Righteous Army soldiers were killed and more than 37,000 were wounded in combat. Most of the resistance armies were hunted down and unable to defeat the Japanese army head-on, the Righteous Army split into small bands of partisans to carry on the War of Liberation in China, Siberia and the Baekdu Mountains in Korea. The Japanese troops first quashed the Peasant Army and then disbanded the remainder of the government army. Many of the surviving Korean guerrilla and anti-Japanese government troops fled to Manchuria and Primorsky Krai to carry on their fight.

Early years and expansion (1910–1941)

Japanese migration and land ownership
From around the time of the First Sino-Japanese War of 1894–1895, Japanese merchants started settling in towns and cities in Korea seeking economic opportunity. By 1910 the number of Japanese settlers in Korea had reached over 170,000, comprising the largest single nikkei community in the world at the time.

Many Japanese settlers showed interest in acquiring agricultural land in Korea even before Japanese land-ownership was officially legalized in 1906. Governor-General Terauchi Masatake facilitated settlement through land reform, which initially proved popular with most of the Korean population . The Korean land-ownership system featured absentee landlords, only partial owner-tenants and cultivators with traditional (but no legal proof of) ownership. Terauchi's new Land Survey Bureau conducted cadastral surveys that established ownership on the basis of written proof (deeds, titles, and similar documents). The system denied ownership to those who could not provide such written documentation; these turned out to be mostly high-class and impartial owners who had only traditional verbal cultivator-rights . Japanese landlords included both individuals and corporations (such as the Oriental Development Company). Because of these developments, Japanese landownership soared, as did the amount of land taken over by private Japanese companies. Many former Korean landowners, as well as agricultural workers, became tenant farmers, having lost their entitlements almost overnight because they could not pay for the land reclamation and irrigation improvements forced on them. Compounding the economic stresses imposed on the Korean peasantry, the authorities forced Korean peasants to do long days of compulsory labor to build irrigation works; Japanese imperial officials made peasants pay for these projects in the form of heavy taxes, impoverishing many of them and causing even more of them lose their land. Although many other subsequent developments placed ever greater strain on Korea's peasants, Japan's rice shortage in 1918 was the greatest catalyst for hardship. During that shortage, Japan looked to Korea for increased rice cultivation; as Korean peasants started producing more for Japan, however, the amount they took to eat dropped precipitously, causing much resentment among them.

By 1910 an estimated 7 to 8% of all arable land in Korea had come under Japanese control. This ratio increased steadily; as of the years 1916, 1920, and 1932, the ratio of Japanese land ownership increased from 36.8 to 39.8 to 52.7%. The level of tenancy was similar to that of farmers in Japan itself; however, in Korea, the landowners were mostly Japanese, while the tenants were all Koreans. As often occurred in Japan itself, tenants had to pay over half their crop as rent, forcing many to send wives and daughters into factories or prostitution so they could pay taxes.

By the 1930s the growth of the urban economy and the exodus of farmers to the cities had gradually weakened the hold of the landlords.

The Japanese government had hoped emigration to its colonies would mitigate the population boom in the naichi(内地), but had largely failed to accomplish this by 1936. According to figures from 1934, Japanese in Chōsen numbered approximately 561,000 out of a total population of over 21 million, less than 3%. By 1939 the Japanese population increased to 651,000, mostly from Japan's western prefectures. During the same period, the population in Chōsen grew faster than that in the naichi. Koreans also migrated to the naichi in large numbers, especially after 1930; by 1939 there were over 981,000 Koreans living in Japan. Challenges which deterred Japanese from migrating into Chōsen included lack of arable land and population density comparable to that of Japan.

Anthropology and cultural heritage

In 1925, the Japanese government established the Korean History Compilation Committee, and it was administered by the Governor-General of Korea and engaged in collecting Korean historical materials and compiling Korean history. According to the Doosan Encyclopedia, some mythology was incorporated. The committee supported the theory of a Japanese colony on the Korean Peninsula called Mimana, which, according to E. Taylor Atkins, is "among the most disputed issues in East Asian historiography."

Japan executed the first modern archaeological excavations in Korea. The Japanese administration also relocated some artifacts; for instance, a stone monument, which was originally located in the Liaodong Peninsula, then under Japanese control, was taken out of its context and moved to Pyongyang. As of April 2020, 81,889 Korean cultural artifacts are in Japan. According to the Overseas Korean Cultural Heritage Foundation, not all the artifacts were moved illegally. Adding to the challenge of repatriating illegally exported Korean cultural properties is the lack of experts in Korean art at overseas museums and institutions, alterations made to artifacts that obscure their origin, and that moving Korean artifacts within what was previously internationally recognized Japanese territory was lawful at the time. The South Korean government has been continuing its efforts to repatriate Korean artifacts from museums and private collections overseas.

The National Palace Museum of Korea, originally built as the Korean Imperial Museum in 1908 to preserve the treasures in the Gyeongbokgung, was retained under the Japanese administration but renamed Museum of the Yi Dynasty in 1938.

The Governor-General of Korea instituted a law in 1933 in order to preserve Korea's most important historical artifacts. The system established by this law, retained as the present-day National Treasures of South Korea and National Treasures of North Korea, was intended to preserve Korean historical artifacts, including those not yet unearthed. Japan's 1871 Edict for the Preservation of Antiquities and Old Items could not be automatically applied to Korea due to Japanese law, which required an imperial ordinance to apply the edict in Korea. The 1933 law to protect Korean cultural heritages was based on the Japanese 1871 edict.

Gyeongbokgung, the Korean royal palace, was demolished during the Japanese colonial period. In 1911, after the annexation of Korea by Japan, ownership of the property was transferred to the Japanese Governor-General of Korea. In 1915, more than 90% of the buildings were torn down to make room for an exhibition.

Restoration of Gyeongbokgung has been undertaken since 1990. The Government-General Building was demolished in 1996 and the Heungnyemun (2001) and Gwanghwamun (2006–10) were restored according to their original placements and designs.

Anti-Chinese riots of 1931

Due to a waterway construction permit, in the small town of Wanpaoshan in Manchuria near Changchun, "violent clashes" broke out between the local Chinese and Korean immigrants on 2 July 1931. The Chosun Ilbo, a major Korean newspaper, misreported that many Koreans had died in the clashes, sparking a Chinese exclusion movement in urban areas of the Korean Peninsula. The worst of the rioting occurred in Pyongyang on 5 July. Approximately 127 Chinese people were killed, 393 wounded, and a considerable number of properties were destroyed by  Korean residents. Republic of China further alleged the Japanese authorities in Korea did not take adequate steps to protect the lives and property of the Chinese residents, and blamed the authorities for allowing inflammatory accounts to be published. As a result of this riot, the Minister of Foreign Affairs Kijūrō Shidehara, who insisted on Japanese, Chinese, and Korean harmony, lost his position.

Order to change names

Attempts were made to introduce the modern household registration system. This brought about the abolishment of the Korean caste system. In 1911, the proclamation "Matter Concerning the Changing of Korean Names" was issued, barring ethnic Koreans from taking Japanese names and retroactively reverting the names of Koreans who had already registered under Japanese names back to the original Korean ones. By 1939, however, this position was reversed and Japan's focus had shifted towards cultural assimilation of the Korean people; Imperial Decree 19 and 20 on Korean Civil Affairs (Sōshi-kaimei) went into effect, whereby ethnic Koreans were forced to surrender their traditional use of clan-based Korean family name system, in favor for a new surname to be used in the family register. The surname could be of their own choosing, including their native clan name, but in practice many Koreans received a Japanese surname. There is controversy over whether or not the adoption of a Japanese surname was effectively mandatory, or merely strongly encouraged.

World War II

National Mobilization Law

Deportation of forced labor

The combination of immigrants and forced laborers during World War II brought the total to over 2 million Koreans in Japan by the end of the war, according to estimates by the Supreme Commander for the Allied Powers. In 1946, some 1,340,000 ethnic Koreans were repatriated to Korea, with 650,000 choosing to remain in Japan, where they now form the Zainichi Korean community. A 1982 survey by the Korean Youth Association showed that conscripted laborers account for 13 percent of first-generation Zainichi Koreans.

From 1939, labor shortages as a result of conscription of Japanese males for the military efforts of World War II led to organized official recruitment of Koreans to work in mainland Japan, initially through civilian agents, and later directly, often involving elements of coercion. As the labor shortage increased, by 1942, the Japanese authorities extended the provisions of the National Mobilization Law to include the conscription of Korean workers for factories and mines on the Korean Peninsula, Manchukuo, and the involuntary relocation of workers to Japan itself as needed.

Of the 5,400,000 Koreans conscripted, about 670,000 were taken to mainland Japan (including Karafuto Prefecture, present-day Sakhalin, now part of Russia) for civilian labor. Those who were brought to Japan were often forced to work under appalling and dangerous conditions. Apparently Koreans were better treated than laborers from other countries, but still their work hours, food and medical care were such that large numbers died. This is clear from the 60,000 Korean laborers who died in Japan out of the nearly 670,000 who were brought there in the years 1939 to 1945. The total number of deaths of Korean forced laborers in Korea and Manchuria is estimated to be between 270,000 and 810,000. The 43,000 ethnic Koreans in Karafuto, which had been occupied by the Soviet Union just prior to Japan's surrender, were refused repatriation to either mainland Japan or the Korean Peninsula, and were thus trapped in Sakhalin, stateless; they became the ancestors of the Sakhalin Koreans. Korean laborers were also found as far as the Tarawa Atoll, where during the Battle of Tarawa only 129 of the 1200 laborers survived. Korean laborers also worked in Korea itself, notably in Jeju where in the later stages of the Pacific War Korean laborers expanded airfields and built facilities at Alddreu Airfield in order to block a US invasion of the Japanese mainland and in 1945 laborers on Songak Mountain (where several airstrips were located) were ordered to smooth down the slope in order to prevent American vehicles from going over.

Most Korean atomic-bomb victims in Japan had been drafted for work at military industrial factories in Hiroshima and Nagasaki. In the name of humanitarian assistance, Japan paid South Korea four billion yen (approx. thirty five million dollars) and built a welfare center for those suffering from the effects of the atomic bomb.

Korean service in the Japanese military

Japan did not draft ethnic Koreans into its military until 1944 when the tide of World War II turned against it. Until 1944, enlistment in the Imperial Japanese Army by ethnic Koreans was voluntary, and highly competitive. From a 14% acceptance rate in 1938, it dropped to a 2% acceptance rate in 1943 while the raw number of applicants increased from 3000 per annum to 300,000 in just five years during World War II.

Korea produced seven generals and numerous field grade officers (Colonels, Lieutenant-Colonels and Majors) during 35 years of colonial governance by Japan, despite institutionalized discrimination.
The best-known general was Lieutenant General and Crown Prince Yi Un, who commanded Japanese forces in China and later became a member of the Supreme War Council. The other six were graduates of the Imperial Japanese Army Academy. They were: Lieutenant General Jo Seonggeun; Major General Wang Yushik; Lieutenant General Viscount Yi Beyongmu; Major General Yi Heedu; Major General Kim Eungseon (also military aide and personal guard to Prince Yi Un); and Lieutenant General Hong Sa-ik, who was executed for war crimes committed while commanding the prison camps in the southern Philippines in 1944–1945.

Other Korean officers who served Japan moved on to successful careers in post-colonial South Korea. Examples include Park Chung-hee, who became president of South Korea; Chung Il-kwon, prime minister from 1964 to 1970; Paik Sun-yup, South Korea's youngest general who was famous for his command of the 1st Infantry Division during the defense of the Pusan Perimeter, and Kim Suk-won, a colonel of the Imperial Japanese Army who subsequently became a general of the South Korean army. The first ten of the Chiefs of Army Staff of South Korea graduated from the Imperial Japanese Army Academy and none from the Korean Liberation Army.

Officer cadets had been joining the Japanese Army since before the annexation by attending the Imperial Japanese Army Academy. Enlisted Soldier recruitment began as early as 1938, when the Japanese Kwantung Army in Manchuria began accepting pro-Japanese Korean volunteers into the army of Manchukuo, and formed the Gando Special Force. Koreans in this unit specialized in counter-insurgency operations against communist guerillas in the region of Jiandao. The size of the unit grew considerably at an annual rate of 700 men, and included such notable Koreans as General Paik Sun-yup, who served in the Korean War. Historian Philip Jowett noted that during the Japanese occupation of Manchuria, the Gando Special Force "earned a reputation for brutality and was reported to have laid waste to large areas which came under its rule."

Starting in 1944, Japan started the conscription of Koreans into the armed forces. All Korean males were drafted to either join the Imperial Japanese Army, as of April 1944, or work in the military industrial sector, as of September 1944. Before 1944, 18,000 Koreans passed the examination for induction into the army. Koreans provided workers to mines and construction sites around Japan. The number of conscripted Koreans reached its peak in 1944 in preparation for war. From 1944, about 200,000 Korean males were inducted into the army.

During World War II, American soldiers frequently encountered Korean soldiers within the ranks of the Imperial Japanese Army. Most notably was in the Battle of Tarawa, which was considered during that time to be one of the bloodiest battles in U.S. military history. A fifth of the Japanese garrison during this battle consisted of Korean laborers, where on the last night of the battle a combined 300 Japanese soldiers and Korean laborers did a last ditch charge. Like their Japanese counterparts, many of them were killed.

The Japanese, however, did not always believe they could rely on Korean laborers to fight alongside them. In Prisoners of the Japanese, author Gaven Daws wrote, "[O]n Tinian there were five thousand Korean laborers and so as not to have hostiles at their back when the Americans invaded, the Japanese killed them."

After the war, 148 Koreans were convicted of Class B and C Japanese war crimes, 23 of whom were sentenced to death (compared to 920 Japanese who were sentenced to death), including Korean prison guards who were particularly notorious for their brutality during the war. The figure is relatively high considering that ethnic Koreans made up a small percentage of the Japanese military. Judge Bert Röling, who represented the Netherlands at the International Military Tribunal for the Far East, noted that "many of the commanders and guards in POW camps were Koreans – the Japanese apparently did not trust them as soldiers – and it is said that they were sometimes far more cruel than the Japanese." In his memoirs, Colonel Eugene C. Jacobs wrote that during the Bataan Death March, "the Korean guards were the most abusive. The Japanese didn't trust them in battle, so used them as service troops; the Koreans were anxious to get blood on their bayonets; and then they thought they were veterans."

Korean guards were sent to the remote jungles of Burma, where Lt. Col. William A. (Bill) Henderson wrote from his own experience that some of the guards overseeing the construction of the Burma Railway "were moronic and at times almost bestial in their treatment of prisoners. This applied particularly to Korean private soldiers, conscripted only for guard and sentry duties in many parts of the Japanese empire. Regrettably, they were appointed as guards for the prisoners throughout the camps of Burma and Siam." The highest-ranking Korean to be prosecuted after the war was Lieutenant General Hong Sa-ik, who was in command of all the Japanese prisoner-of-war camps in the Philippines.

Comfort women

During World War II, many ethnic Korean girls and women (mostly aged 12–17) were forced by the Japanese military to become sex slaves on the pretext of being hired for jobs, such as a seamstresses or factory workers, and were forced to provide sexual service for Japanese soldiers by agencies or their families against their wishes. These women were euphemistically called "comfort women".

According to an interrogation report by U.S. Army in 1944, comfort women were in good physical health. They were able to have a periodic checkup once a week and to receive treatment in case of spreading disease to the Japanese soldiers, but not for their own health. However, a 1996 United Nations Report detailed that "large numbers of women were forced to submit to prolonged prostitution under conditions which were frequently indescribably traumatic". Documents which survived the war revealed "beyond doubt the extent to which the Japanese forces took direct responsibility for the comfort stations" and that the published practices were "in stark contrast with the brutality and cruelty of the practice. Chizuko Ueno at Kyoto University cautions against the claim that women were not forced as the fact that "no positive sources exist supporting claims that comfort women were forced labor" must be treated with doubt, as "it is well known that the great majority of potentially damaging official documents were destroyed in anticipation of the Allied occupation".

The Asian Women's Fund claimed that during World War II, the Imperial Japanese Army recruited anywhere from tens of thousands to hundreds of thousands of women from occupied territories to be used as sex slaves. Yoshimi Yoshiaki asserted that possibly hundreds of thousands of girls and women, mainly from China and the Korean Peninsula but also Southeast Asian countries occupied by the Imperial Japanese Army, as well as Australia and the Netherlands, were forced to serve as comfort women. According to testimonies, young women were abducted from their homes in countries under Imperial Japanese rule. In many cases, women were lured with promises of work in factories or restaurants. In some cases propaganda advocated equity and the sponsorship of women in higher education. Other enticements were false advertising for nursing jobs at outposts or Japanese army bases; once recruited, they were incarcerated in comfort stations both inside their nations and abroad.

From the early nineties onward, former Korean comfort women have continued to protest against the Japanese government for apparent historical negationism of crimes committed by the Imperial Japanese Army, and have sought compensation for their sufferings during the war. There has also been international support for compensation, such as from the European Union, the Netherlands, Canada and the Philippines. The United States passed House of Representatives House Resolution 121 on July 30, 2007, asking the Japanese government to redress the situation and to incorporate comfort women into school curriculum. Hirofumi Hayashi at the University of Manchester argues that the resolution has helped to counter the "arguments of ultrarightists flooding the mainstream mass media" and warned against the rationalization of the comfort women system.

Religion and ideology

Korean nationalist historiography, centered on minjok, an ethnically or racially defined Korean nation, emerged in the early twentieth century among Korean intellectuals who wanted to foster national consciousness to achieve Korean independence from Japanese domination. Its first proponent was journalist and independence activist Shin Chaeho (1880–1936). In his polemical New Reading of History (Doksa Sillon), which was published in 1908 three years after Korea became a Japanese protectorate, Shin proclaimed that Korean history was the history of the Korean minjok, a distinct race descended from the god Dangun that had once controlled not only the Korean peninsula but also large parts of Manchuria.  Shin and other Korean intellectuals like Park Eun-sik (1859–1925) and Choe Nam-seon (1890–1957) continued to develop these themes in the 1910s and 1920s. They rejected two prior ways of representing the past: the Neo-Confucian historiography of Joseon Korea's scholar-bureaucrats, which they blamed for perpetuating a servile worldview centered around China, and Japanese colonial historiography, which portrayed Korea as historically dependent and culturally backward. 
The work of these prewar nationalist historians has shaped postwar historiography in both North and South Korea.

Protestant Christian missionary efforts in Asia were quite successful in Korea. American Presbyterians and Methodists arrived in the 1880s and were well received. They served as medical and educational missionaries, establishing schools and hospitals in numerous cities. In the years when Korea was under Japanese control, some Koreans adopted Christianity as an expression of nationalism in opposition to the Japan's efforts to promote the Japanese language and the Shinto religion.  
In 1914 of 16 million Koreans, there were 86,000 Protestants and 79,000 Catholics. By 1934 the numbers were 168,000 and 147,000, respectively. Presbyterian missionaries were especially successful. Harmonizing with traditional practices became an issue.  The Protestants developed a substitute for Confucian ancestral rites by merging Confucian-based and Christian death and funerary rituals.

Independence and division of Korea

Following the dropping of atomic bombs on Hiroshima and Nagasaki, Soviet invasion of Manchuria, and the impending overrun of the Korean Peninsula by U.S. and Soviet forces, Japan surrendered to the Allied forces on 15 August 1945, ending 35 years of Japanese colonial rule.

American forces under General John R. Hodge arrived at the southern part of the Korean Peninsula on 8 September 1945, while the Soviet Army and some Korean Communists had stationed themselves in the northern part of the Korean Peninsula. U.S. Colonel Dean Rusk proposed to Chischakov, the Soviet military administrator of northern Korea, that Korea should be split at the 38th parallel. This proposal was made at an emergency meeting to determine postwar spheres of influence, which led to the division of Korea.

After the liberation of Korea from Japanese rule, the "Name Restoration Order" was issued on 23 October 1946 by the United States Army Military Government in Korea south of the 38th parallel, enabling Koreans to restore their names if they wished. Many Koreans in Japan chose to retain their Japanese names, either to avoid discrimination, or later, to meet the requirements for naturalization as Japanese citizens.

Korean independence movement

Upon Emperor Gojong's death, anti-Japanese rallies took place nationwide, most notably the March 1st Movement of 1919. A declaration of independence was read in Seoul. It is estimated that 2 million people took part in these rallies. The Japanese violently suppressed the protests: According to Korean records, 46,948 were arrested, 7,509 killed and 15,961 wounded; according to Japanese figures, 8,437 were arrested, 553 killed and 1,409 wounded. About 7,000 people were killed by Japanese police and soldiers during the 12 months of demonstrations.

After suppression of the uprising, some aspects of Japanese rule considered most objectionable to Koreans were removed. The military police were replaced by a civilian force, and freedom of the press was permitted to a limited extent. Two of the three major Korean daily newspapers, the Tōa Nippō and the Chōsen Nippō, were established in 1920.

Objection to Japanese rule over Korea continued, and the 1 March Movement was a catalyst for the establishment of the Provisional Government of the Republic of Korea by Korean émigrés in Shanghai on 13 April 1919. The modern South Korean government considers this Provisional Government of the Republic of Korea the de jure representation of the Korean people throughout the period of Japanese rule.

The Japanese colonial rule of Korea after annexation was largely uncontested militarily by the smaller, poorly armed, and poorly trained Korean army. Many rebels, former soldiers, and other volunteers left the Korean Peninsula for Manchuria and Primorsky Krai in Russia. Koreans in Manchuria formed resistance groups and guerrilla fighters known as Dongnipgun (Independence Army), which traveled across the Korean-Chinese border, using guerrilla warfare tactics against Japanese forces. The Japanese invasion of Manchuria in 1932 and subsequent Pacification of Manchukuo deprived many of these groups of their bases of operation and supplies. Many were forced to either flee to China, or to join the Red Army-backed forces in eastern Russia. One of the guerrilla groups was led by the future leader of communist North Korea, Kim Il-sung, in Japanese-controlled Manchuria. Kim Il-Sung's time as a guerrilla leader was formative upon his political ideology once he came to power.

Within Korea itself, anti-Japanese rallies continued on occasion. Most notably, the Kōshū Students Anti-Japanese Movement on 3 November 1929 led to the strengthening of Japanese military rule in 1931, after which freedom of the press and freedom of expression were curbed. Many witnesses, including Catholic priests, reported that Japanese authorities dealt with insurgency severely. When villagers were suspected of hiding rebels, entire village populations are said to have been herded into public buildings (especially churches) and massacred when the buildings were set on fire. In the village of  Teigan, Suigen District, Keiki Prefecture (now Jeam-ri, Hwaseong, Gyeongggi Province)  for example, a group of 29 people were gathered inside a church which was then set afire. Such events deepened the hostility of many Korean civilians towards the Japanese government.

On 10 December 1941, the Provisional Government of the Republic of Korea, under the presidency of Kim Gu, declared war on Japan and Germany. Kim Gu organized many of the exiled Korean resistance groups, forming the "Korean Liberation Army". On the other hand, Kim Il-sung led tens of thousands of Koreans who volunteered for the National Revolutionary Army and the People's Liberation Army. The communist-backed Korean Volunteer Army (KVA, 조선의용군, 朝鮮義勇軍) was established in Yenan, China, outside of the Provisional Government's control, from a core of 1,000 deserters from the Imperial Japanese Army. After the Manchurian Strategic Offensive Operation, the KVA entered Manchuria, where it recruited from the ethnic Korean population and eventually became the Korean People's Army of the Democratic People's Republic of Korea.

Administrative division

There were 13 provinces in Korea during Japanese rule: Keiki-dō, Kōgen-dō, Chūseihoku-dō, Chūseinan-dō, Zenrahoku-dō, Zenranan-dō, Keishōhoku-dō, Keishōnan-dō, Heian'nan-dō, Heianhoku-dō, Kōkai-dō, Kankyōnan-dō, and Kankyōhoku-dō. The administrative capital Keijō was in Keiki-dō.

Economy and exploitation

Economic output in terms of agriculture, fishery, forestry and industry increased by tenfold from 1910 to 1945 as illustrated on the chart to the right. Princeton's Atul Kohli concluded that the economic development model the Japanese instituted played the crucial role in Korean economic development, a model that was maintained by the Koreans in the post-World War II era.

Randall S. Jones wrote that "economic development during the colonial period can be said to have laid the foundation for future growth in several respects." According to Myung Soo Cha of Yeungnam University, "the South Korean developmental state, as symbolized by Park Chung Hee, a former officer of the Japanese Imperial army serving in wartime Manchuria, was closely modeled upon the colonial system of government. In short, South Korea grew on the shoulders of the colonial achievement, rather than emerging out of the ashes left by the Korean War, as is sometimes asserted."

A 2017 study found that the gradual removal of trade barriers (almost fully completed by 1923) after Japan's annexation of Korea "increased population growth rates more in the regions close to the former border between Japan and Korea than in the other regions. Furthermore, after integration, the regions close to Korea that specialized in the fabric industry, whose products were the primary goods exported from Japan to Korea, experienced more population growth than other regions close to Korea did."

There were some modernization efforts by the late 19th century prior to annexation. Seoul became the first city in East Asia to have electricity, trolley cars, water, telephone, and telegraph systems all at the same time, but Korea remained a largely backward agricultural economy around the start of the 20th century. "Japan's initial colonial policy was to increase agricultural production in Korea to meet Japan's growing need for rice. Japan also began to build large-scale industries in Korea in the 1930s as part of the empire-wide program of economic self-sufficiency and war preparation." In terms of exports, "Japanese industry as a whole gained little ... and this is certainly true for the most important manufacturing sector, cotton textiles. This export trade had little impact, positive or negative, on the welfare of Japanese consumer." Likewise in terms of the profitability of Japanese investors: colonial Korea made no significant impact.

According to scholar Donald S. Macdonald, "for centuries most Koreans lived as subsistence farmers of rice and other grains and satisfied most of their basic needs through their own labor or through barter. The manufactures of traditional Korea – principally cloth, cooking and eating utensils, furniture, jewelry, and paper – were produced by artisans in a few population centers."

However, under Japanese rule, many Korean resources were only used for Japan. Economist Suh Sang-chul points out that the nature of industrialization during the period was as an "imposed enclave", so the impact of colonialism was trivial. Another scholar, Song Byung-nak, states that the economic condition of average Koreans deteriorated during the period despite the economic growth. Cha primarily attributed this deterioration to global economic shocks and laissez-faire policies, as well as Chōsen's rapid population growth; the colonial government's attempts to mitigate this problem were inadequate. Most Koreans at the time could access only a primary school education under restriction by the Japanese, and this prevented the growth of an indigenous entrepreneurial class. A 1939 statistic shows that among the total capital recorded by factories, about 94 percent was Japanese-owned. While Koreans owned about 61 percent of small-scale firms that had 5 to 49 employees, about 92 percent of large-scale enterprises with more than 200 employees were Japanese-owned.

The Japanese government created a system of colonial mercantilism, requiring construction of significant transportation infrastructure on the Korean Peninsula for the purpose of extracting and exploiting resources such as raw materials (timber), foodstuff (mostly rice and fish), and mineral resources (coal and iron ore). The Japanese developed port facilities and an extensive railway system which included a main trunk railway from the southern port city of Pusan through the capital of Seoul and north to the Chinese border. This infrastructure was intended not only to facilitate a colonial mercantilist economy, but was also viewed as a strategic necessity for the Japanese military to control Korea and to move large numbers of troops and materials to the Chinese border at short notice.

From the late 1920s and into the 1930s, particularly during the tenure of Japanese Governor-General Kazushige Ugaki, concentrated efforts were made to build up the industrial base in Korea. This was especially true in the areas of heavy industry, such as chemical plants and steel mills, and munitions production. The Japanese military felt it would be beneficial to have production closer to the source of raw materials and closer to potential front lines for a future war with China.

Lee Young-hoon, a professor at Seoul National University states that less than 10% of arable land actually came under Japanese control and rice was normally traded, not robbed. He also insists that Koreans' knowledge about the era under Japanese rule is mostly made up by later educators. Many of Lee's arguments, however, have been contested.

According to Alleyne Ireland, a British author, he referred to condition of Korea under Japanese rule. As of 1926, he described on his book "The New Korea", "looking forward from 1910, one thing was clear where many things were obscure, namely that Japan, having decided to make Korea part of her Empire, would deem the permanence of her occupation to be a major element of her national policy, to be held intact, at whatever cost, against internal revolt or foreign intrigue. The Japanese refer with pride to their effective protection of life and property throughout a country but recently overrun by bandits, to the enormous increase during the past fifteen years in every branch of production, with its connotation of increased employment for Koreans, to the constantly mounting number of Koreans appointed to the government service are facts, that cannot be gainsaid. However, the Korean nationalists attribute to them a sinister significance."

Drug trade 
Korea produced a small amount of opium during the earlier years of the colonial period, but by the 1930s, Korea became a major exporter of both opium and narcotics, becoming a significant supplier to the illicit drug trade, specifically to the opium monopoly created by the Japanese-sponsored Manchukuo government. The Government-General developed facilities dedicated to the production of morphine and heroin. Emigrant Koreans played an extensive role in drug trafficking in China, especially in Manchuria, where they were employed as poppy farmers, drug peddlers, or proprietors of opium dens - disreputable jobs that were at the bottom rung of the drug trafficking ladder. The initiation of opium and narcotic production in Korea was motivated by the worldwide shortage of opium and Japan's unfavorable environment for poppy cultivation, making the Japanese entirely dependent on foreign imports to meet domestic demand for medical opium. The Japanese discovered that Korea provided favorable climate and soil conditions for poppy cultivation; not only were the climate and soil conditions more suitable, but land and labor costs were lower than in Japan. Farmers in Korea were aware of the global demand for opium, and welcomed the idea of increasing the amount of land for poppy cultivation, an idea that was introduced to them by Japanese pharmaceutical companies. The sale and consumption of drugs were pervasive in Korea, where the country faced a substantial domestic drug abuse problem, appearing in the form of opium-smoking and morphine addiction. Within Korea, most illicit narcotics were supplied by Japanese druggists.

Changes to Korean culture under Japanese rule

Newspaper censorship
In 1907, the Japanese government passed the Newspaper Law which effectively prevented the publication of local papers. Only the Korean-language newspaper Daehan Maeil Shinbo continued its publication, because it was run by a foreigner named Ernest Bethell. For the first decade of colonial rule, therefore, there were no Korean-owned newspapers whatsoever, although books were steadily printed and there were several dozen Korean-owned magazines. In 1920 these laws were relaxed, and in 1932 Japan eliminated a significant double standard which had been making Korean publication significantly more difficult than Japanese publication. Even with these relaxed rules, however, the government still seized newspapers without warning: there are over a thousand recorded seizures between 1920 and 1939. Revocation of publishing rights was relatively rare, and only three magazines had their rights revoked over the entire colonial period. In 1940, as the Pacific War increased in intensity, Japan shut down all Korean language newspapers again.

Education

Following the annexation of Korea, the Japanese administration introduced a free public education system modeled after the Japanese school system with a pyramidal hierarchy of elementary, middle and high schools, culminating at the Keijō Imperial University in Keijō. As in Japan itself, education was viewed primarily as an instrument of "the Formation of the Imperial Citizen" (황민화; 皇民化; Kōminka) with a heavy emphasis on moral and political instruction. Japanese religious groups such as Protestant Christians willingly supported the Japanese authorities in their effort to assimilate Koreans through education.

During colonial times, elementary schools were known as "Citizen Schools" (kokumin gakkō) as in Japan, as a means of forming proper "Imperial Citizens" (황국민; 皇国民; kōkokumin) from early childhood. Elementary schools in South Korea today are known by the name chodeung hakgyo ("elementary school") as the term gungmin hakgyo/kokumin gakkō has recently become a politically incorrect term.

During the colonial period, Japan established an officially equal educational system in Korea, but it strictly limited the rate of coed education. After the Korean Educational Ordinance was published in 1938, this situation changed slightly. "Primary education consisted of a mandated four years of primary school (futsu gakkō). Secondary education included four years of middle school for boys (koto futsu gakkō) and three years for girls (joshi koto futsu gakko) or two to three years of vocational school (jitsugyo gakkō). 1915, the Japanese announced the Regulations for Technical Schools (senmon gakko kisoku), which legalized technical schools (senmon gakkō) as post-secondary educational institutions."

In addition, modernized (for the time) Korean educational institutions were excluded from the colonial system. 1911, Japanese government set The Regulations for Private Schools (Shiritsu gakko kisoku) which was aimed at undermining these facilities, which showed patriotic awakening.

The public curriculum for most of the period was taught by Korean educators under a hybrid system focused on assimilating Koreans into the Japanese Empire while emphasizing Korean cultural education. This focused on the history of the Japanese Empire as well as inculcating reverence for the Imperial House of Japan and instruction in the Imperial Rescript on Education.

Integration of Korean students into Japanese-language schools and Japanese students in Korean-language schools was discouraged but steadily increased over time. While official policy promoted equality between ethnic Koreans and ethnic Japanese, in practice this was rarely the case. Korean history and language studies would be taught side by side with Japanese history and language studies until the early 1940s under a new education ordinance that saw wartime efforts increased and the hybrid system slowly weakened.

One point of view is that, although the Japanese education system in Korea was detrimental towards Korea's cultural identity, its introduction of public education as universal was a step in the right direction to improve Korea's human capital. Towards the end of Japanese rule, Korea saw elementary school attendance at 38 percent. Children of elite families were able to advance to higher education, while others were able to attend technical schools, allowing for "the emergence of a small but important class of well-educated white collar and technical workers ... who possessed skills required to run a modern industrial economy." The Japanese education system ultimately produced hundreds of thousands of educated South Koreans who later became "the core of the postwar political and economic elite."

Another point of view is that it was only after the end of Japanese rule with World War II that Korea saw true, democratic rise in public education as evidenced by the rise of adult literacy rate from 22 percent in 1945 to 87.6 percent by 1970 and 93% by the late 1980s. Though free public education was made available for elementary schools during Japanese rule, Korea as a country did not experience secondary-school enrollment rates comparable to those of Japan prior to the end of World War II.

Japanese policies for the Korean language
In the initial phase of Japanese rule, students were taught in Korean in public schools established by ethnic Korean officials who worked for the colonial government. While prior to this schools in Korea had used mostly Hanja, during this time Korean came to be written in a mixed Hanja–Korean script influenced by the Japanese writing system, where most lexical roots were written in Hanja and grammatical forms in Korean script. Korean textbooks from this era included excerpts from traditional Korean stories such as Heungbujeon/Kōfuden (흥부전/興夫伝).

In 1921, government efforts were strengthened to promote Korean media and literature throughout Korea and also in Japan. The Japanese government also created incentives to educate ethnic Japanese students in the Korean language. In 1928, the Korean Language Society inaugurated Hangul Day (9 October), which was meant to celebrate the Korean alphabet in the face of accelerating Japanization of Korean culture.

The Japanese administrative policy shifted more aggressively towards cultural assimilation in 1938 (Naisen ittai) with a new government report advising reform to strengthen the war effort. This left less room for Korean language studies and by 1943 all Korean language courses had been phased out. Teaching and speaking of Korean was prohibited. Although the government report advised further, more radical reform, the 10-year plan would never fully go into effect.

Removal and return of historical artifacts
The Japanese rule of Korea also resulted in the relocation of tens of thousands of cultural artifacts to Japan. The issue over where these artifacts should be located began during the U.S. occupation of Japan. In 1965, as part of the Treaty on Basic Relations between Japan and the Republic of Korea, Japan returned roughly 1,400 artifacts to Korea, and considered the diplomatic matter to have been resolved. Korean artifacts are retained in the Tōkyō National Museum and in the hands of many private collectors.

According to the South Korean government, there are 75,311 cultural artifacts that were taken from Korea. Japan has 34,369, the United States has 17,803, and France had several hundred, which were seized in the French campaign against Korea and loaned back to Korea in 2010 without an apology. In 2010, Prime Minister of Japan Naoto Kan expressed "deep remorse" for the removal of artifacts, and arranged an initial plan to return the Royal Protocols of the Joseon Dynasty and over 1,200 other books, which was carried out in 2011.

Anthropology and religion
Japan sent anthropologists to Korea who took photos of the traditional state of Korean villages, serving as evidence that Korea was "backwards" and needed to be modernized.

As Japan established the puppet state of Manchukuo, Korea became more vital to the internal communications and defense of the Japanese empire against the Soviet Union. Japan decided in the 1930s to make the Koreans become more loyal to the Emperor by requiring Korean participation in the State Shinto devotions, and by weakening the influences of both Christianity and traditional religion.

The primary building of Gyeongbokgung Palace was demolished and the Japanese General Government Building was built in its exact location. The Japanese colonial authorities destroyed 85 percent of all the buildings in Gyeongbokgung. Sungnyemun, the gate in Gyeongsong that was a symbol of Korea, was altered by the addition of large, Shinto-style golden horns near the roofs, later removed by the South Korean government after independence.

Christianity and communism

Protestant missionary efforts in Asia were nowhere more successful than in Korea. American Presbyterians and Methodists arrived in the 1880s and were well received. During the Japanese colonial period, Christianity became an expression of Korean nationalist opposition to Japan and its assimilation policies. In 1914, out of 16 million people, there were 86,000 Protestants and 79,000 Catholics; by 1934 the numbers were 168,000 and 147,000. Presbyterian missionaries were especially successful. Harmonizing with traditional practices became an issue. Catholics tolerated Shinto rites; Protestants developed a substitute for Confucian ancestral rites by merging Confucian-based and Christian death and funerary rituals.

Missionaries expressed alarm at the rise in communist activity during the 1920s. With the enactment of the Peace Preservation Law in 1925, communist literature was banned throughout the Empire of Japan, including Chōsen; in order to avoid suspicion and permit dissemination, it was often disguised as Christian literature addressed to missionaries. Communist concepts, such as class struggle, and its partner nationalist movement were resonating well with some of the peasants and lower-class citizens of Chōsen; this was worrying to some missionaries because of communism's atheist components. At one point, communist students in Keijō held an "anti-Sunday School conference" and loudly protested religion in front of churches. This protest renewed Japanese governmental interest in censorship of communist ideas and language.

Legacy

Widespread unrest occurred during the March 1st Movement. The Japanese colonial and military police were unable to maintain control, requiring the army and navy to assist. There were several reports of atrocities. In one instance, Japanese police in the village of Teigan, Suigen District, Keiki Prefecture (now Jeam-ri, Hwaseong, Gyeongggi Province) herded everyone into a church, locked it, and burned it to the ground. They also shot through the burning windows of the church to ensure that no one made it out alive. Many participants of the 1 March Movement were subjected to torture and execution.

Result of the name changes
Although officially voluntary, and initially resisted by the Japanese Colonial Government, 80% of Koreans voluntarily changed their name to Japanese in 1940. Many community leaders urged the adoption of Japanese names to make it easy for their children to succeed in society and overcome discrimination.

A study conducted by the United States Library of Congress states that "the Korean culture was quashed, and Koreans were required to speak Japanese and take Japanese names". This name change policy, called sōshi-kaimei, was part of Japan's assimilation efforts. This was heavily resisted by the Korean people. Those Koreans who retained their Korean names were not allowed to enroll at school, were refused service at government offices, and were excluded from the lists for food rations and other supplies. Faced
with such compulsion, many Koreans ended up complying with the Name Change Order. Such a radical policy was deemed to be symbolically significant in the war effort, binding the fate of Korea with that of the empire. A number of prominent ethnic Koreans working for the Japanese government, including General Kō Shiyoku/Hong Sa-ik, insisted on keeping their Korean names. Another ethnic Korean, Boku Shunkin/Park Chun-Geum (박춘금, 朴春琴), was elected as a member of the Lower House from the Tōkyō Third District in the general election in 1932 and served two terms without changing his Korean name, but has been registered as chinilpa by the current Republic of Korea government.

Forced laborers and comfort women

During World War II, about 450,000 Korean male laborers were involuntarily sent to Japan. Comfort women, who served in Japanese military brothels as a form of sexual slavery, came from all over the Japanese empire. Historical estimates range from 10,000 to 200,000, including an unknown number of Koreans. However, 200,000 is considered to be a conservative number by modern historians, and up to 500,000 comfort women are estimated to be taken. These women faced an average of 29 men and up to 40 men per day, according to one surviving comfort woman. However, of the 500,000, less than 50 are alive . Comfort women were often recruited from rural locales with the promise of factory employment; business records, often from Korean subcontractees of Japanese companies, showed them falsely classified as nurses or secretaries. There is evidence that the Japanese government intentionally destroyed official records regarding comfort women.

In 2002, South Korea started an investigation of Japanese collaborators. Part of the investigation was completed in 2006 and a list of names of individuals who profited from exploitation of fellow Koreans were posted. The collaborators not only benefited from exploiting their countrymen, but the children of these collaborators benefited further by acquiring higher education with the exploitation money they had amassed.

The "Truth Commission on Forced Mobilization under the Japanese Imperialism Republic of Korea" investigated the received reports for damage from 86 people among the 148 Koreans who were accused of being the level B and C war criminals while serving as prison guards for the Japanese military during World War II. The commission, which was organized by the South Korean government, announced that they acknowledge 83 people among them as victims. The commission said that although the people reluctantly served as guards to avoid the draft, they took responsibility for mistreatment by the Japanese against prisoners of war. Lee Se-il, leader of the investigation, said that examination of the military prosecution reports for 15 Korean prison guards, obtained from The National Archives of the United Kingdom, confirmed that they were convicted without explicit evidence.

Koreans in Unit 731
Koreans, along with many other Asians, were experimented on in Unit 731, a secret military medical experimentation unit in World War II. The victims who died in the camp included at least 25 victims from the former Soviet Union and Korea. General Shiro Ishii, the head of Unit 731, revealed during the Tōkyō War Crime Trials that 254 Koreans were killed in Unit 731. Some historians estimate up to 250,000 total people were subjected to human experiments. A Unit 731 veteran attested that most that were experimented on were Chinese, Koreans and Mongolians.

Discrimination against Korean leprosy patients by Japan
Colonial Korea was subject to the same Leprosy Prevention Laws of 1907 and 1931 as the Japanese home islands. These laws directly and indirectly permitted the quarantine of patients in sanitariums, where forced abortions and sterilization were common. The laws authorized punishment of patients "disturbing the peace", as most Japanese leprologists believed that vulnerability to the disease was inheritable. In Korea, many leprosy patients were also subjected to hard labor.
The Japanese government compensated inpatients.

Atomic bomb casualties

Many Koreans were drafted for work at military industrial factories in Hiroshima and Nagasaki. According to the secretary-general of a group named Peace Project Network, "there were a total of 70,000 Korean victims in both cities". Japan paid South Korea 4 billion yen and built a welfare center in the name of humanitarian assistance, not as compensation to the victims.

South Korean presidential investigation commission on pro-Japanese collaborators
Collaborators of the Imperial Japanese Army were prosecuted in the postwar period as Chinilpa, or "friendly to Japanese". In 2006 South Korean president Roh Moo-hyun appointed an investigation commission into the issue of locating descendants of pro-Japanese collaborators from the times of the 1890s until the collapse of Japanese rule in 1945.

In 2010, the commission concluded its five-volume report. As a result, the land property of 168 South Korean citizens has been confiscated by the government, these citizens being descendants of pro-Japanese collaborators.

List of governors-general of Korea 

Below is a list of governors-general of Korea under Japanese rule:
 Terauchi Masatake (1910–1916)
 Hasegawa Yoshimichi (1916–1919)
 Saitō Makoto (1929–1931)
 Kazushige Ugaki (1931–1936)
 Yamanashi Hanzō (1927–1929)
 Jirō Minami (1936–1942)
 Kuniaki Koiso (1942–1944)
 Nobuyuki Abe (1944–1945)

In popular culture
 Madam Oh, 1965 South Korean film
 Sea of Blood, 1971 North Korean opera
 The Flower Girl, 1972 North Korean film
Tell O' The Forest!, 1972 North Korean opera
 Femme Fatale: Bae Jeong-ja, 1973 South Korean film
 Mulberry, 1986 South Korean film
 Modern Boy, 2008 South Korean film
 Capital Scandal, 2008 South Korea TV drama
 The Good, the Bad, the Weird, 2008 South Korea film
 My Way, 2011 South Korean film
 Bridal Mask, 2012 South Korean TV drama
 Assassination, 2015 South Korean film
 The Silenced, 2015 South Korean film
 Spirits' Homecoming, 2016 South Korean film
 The Handmaiden, 2016 South Korean film
 The Last Princess, 2016 South Korean film
 The Age of Shadows, 2016 South Korean film
 Love Lies, 2016 South Korean film
 Chicago Typewriter, 2017 South Korean TV show
 Battleship Island, 2017 South Korean film
 Anarchist from Colony, 2017 South Korean film
 Mr. Sunshine, 2018 South Korean TV show
 Pachinko, 2017 novel by Min Jin Lee
 The Hymn of Death, 2018 South Korean TV show
 Different Dreams, 2019 South Korean TV show
 The Battle: Roar to Victory, 2019 South Korean film
 A Resistance, 2019 South Korean film
 Whale Star: The Gyeongseong Mermaid, 2019 webtoon by Na Yoonhee
 Beasts of a Little Land, 2021 novel by Juhea Kim
 Pachinko, 2022 Apple TV+ drama

See also

 Sōshi-kaimei
 Japanese war crimes
 Hashima Island
 Comfort women
 Japan–Korea disputes
 Taiwan under Japanese rule
 History of Korea

References

Further reading
 Brudnoy, David. "Japan's experiment in Korea." Monumenta Nipponica 25.1/2 (1970): 155–195. online

External links

 Isabella Lucy Bird (1898), Korea and Her Neighbours: A Narrative of Travel, with an Account of the Recent Vicissitudes and Present Position of the Country
 Horace Newton Allen (1908), Things Korean: A Collection of Sketches and Anecdotes, Missionary and Diplomatic
 Toshiyuki Mizoguchi, "Consumer Prices and Real Wages in Taiwan and Korea under Japanese Rule" Hitotsubashi Journal of Economics, 13(1): 40–56
 Toshiyuki Mizoguchi, "Economic Growth of Korea under the Japanese Occupation – Background of Industrialization of Korea 1911–1940" Hitotsubashi Journal of Economics, 20(1): 1–19
 Toshiyuki Mizoguchi, "Foreign Trade in Taiwan and Korea under Japanese Rule" Hitotsubashi Journal of Economics, 14(2): 37–53
 Kim, Young-Koo, The Validity of Some Coerced Treaties in the Early 20th Century: A Reconsideration of the Japanese Annexation of Korea in Legal Perspective
 Matsuki Kunitoshi, "Japan's Annexation of Korea" Society the Dissemination of Historical Fact
 Walter Stucke (2011), The Direct and Indirect Contributions of Western Missionaries to Korean Nationalism During the Late Choson and Early Japanese Annexation Periods, 1884–1920

Korea under Japanese rule
States and territories established in 1910
States and territories disestablished in 1945
Japan–Korea relations
Former colonies in Asia
Japan
Annexation
1910 establishments in Korea
1910 establishments in the Japanese colonial empire
1945 disestablishments in the Japanese colonial empire
1945 disestablishments in Korea
Former Japanese colonies
Japanese military occupations
Former countries of the interwar period
Japanese imperialism and colonialism
Anti-Japanese sentiment in Korea
Anti-Korean sentiment in Japan
Axis powers